Jøssund is a former municipality in the old Sør-Trøndelag county, Norway. The municipality existed from 1896 until its dissolution in 1964. The  municipality encompassed northern coastal area of the present-day municipality of Ørland in Trøndelag county. The main church for Jøssund was Jøssund Church in the village of Jøssund which was the administrative centre of the municipality. Other villages in Jøssund included Lysøysundet and Vallersund.

History

The municipality of Jøssund was established on 1 January 1896 when it was split off from the large municipality of Aafjord. Initially, Jøssund had a population of 1,529. 

During the 1960s, there were many municipal mergers across Norway due to the work of the Schei Committee. On 1 January 1964, the municipality of Jøssund (population: 1,917) was merged with the neighboring municipalities of Bjugn (population: 1,240), Nes (population: 1,107), and the northern part of Stjørna (population: 676) to form a new, larger municipality of Bjugn.

Name
The municipality (originally the parish) is named after the old Jøssund farm. The first element comes from the word  which means "narrow" or "thin". The old name did originally start with an "m", but over time the initial letter disappeared from the spelling and pronunciation (sometime before the early 16th century). Historically, the name's spelling has varied. In the 1500s and 1600s it was spelled  using the letter ß, and by the 1700s, the was written in its current form.

Government
While it existed, this municipality was responsible for primary education (through 10th grade), outpatient health services, senior citizen services, unemployment, social services, zoning, economic development, and municipal roads. During its existence, this municipality was governed by a municipal council of elected representatives, which in turn elected a mayor.

Mayors
The mayors of Jøssund:

 1896–1902: Johan Normann (V)
 1903–1919: Johannes Berg (H)
 1920–1931: Albert Guldvik (V)
 1932–1941: Bjarne Opland (V)
 1942–1945: Eilert Herfjord, Jr. (NS)
 1945–1945: Bjarne Opland (V)
 1946–1953: Nils Lysø (Ap)
 1954–1959: Jens Sundet (Ap)
 1960–1963: Erling Hansen (Ap)

Municipal council
The municipal council  of Jøssund was made up of 17 representatives that were elected to four year terms. The party breakdown of the final municipal council was as follows:

See also
List of former municipalities of Norway

References

Former municipalities of Norway
Ørland
1896 establishments in Norway
1964 disestablishments in Norway